Nelson, also cited as Nelson: The Story of England's Immortal Naval Hero, is a 1918 British historical film directed by Maurice Elvey and starring Donald Calthrop, Malvina Longfellow and Ivy Close. Its screenplay is based on the biography of Admiral Horatio Nelson by Robert Southey.

Cast
 Donald Calthrop - Horatio Nelson 
 Malvina Longfellow - Lady Hamilton 
 Ivy Close - Mrs. Nesbit 
 Ernest Thesiger - Wiliam Pitt 
 Allan Jeayes - Sir William Hamilton 
 Edward O'Neill - King of Naples 
 Teddy Arundell - Captain Berry 
 Eric Barker - Nelson as a child

References

External links

1918 films
1910s historical films
British black-and-white films
British historical films
British biographical films
British silent feature films
1910s English-language films
Cultural depictions of Emma, Lady Hamilton
Napoleonic Wars naval films
Seafaring films
Films directed by Maurice Elvey
Films set in the 1800s
Films based on biographies
Cultural depictions of Horatio Nelson
1910s biographical films
1910s British films
Silent adventure films